The Theater am Neumarkt or by its present official name Theater Neumarkt is a theatre in the German-speaking Switzerland situated at Neumarkt, Zürich. It is part of the building complex Bilgeriturm–Neumarkt and also houses the Hottinger guild for two days a year.

History 
The building was constructed by David Morf in 1742 as the guild house of the Schumacher (shoemakers) guild and was later used as the meeting point of the Communist Party of Switzerland that was there founded in 1923. The government of the city of Zürich bought the building in 1933, since 1966 it houses the present Neumarkt Theater, as well as the Neumarkt restaurant in the ground floor.

The hall in the second floor probably was used sporadically as a venue in the 18th century by the then guild house. Since the 1940s it was in use under the name "Theater am Neumarkt" for guest performances and also served as a permanent venue, among others from 1949 to 1951 to the Cabaret Cornichon. After it had been used as an alternative site to the Schauspielhaus venue, increasingly evident occurred in the fifties and sixties for the use as a contemporary theater.

Program and ensemble 
Thus, on 13 January 1965 the city theater under the direction of the administrative department of the Zürich mayor was established, but failed financially and artisticly. Re-opened on 12 January 1966, presenting Havel's "The Garden Party", the Neumarkt Theater was founded in its present form. Under the direction of Felix Rellstab (1966–1971), it was established as the second theater stage in Zürich that performed contemporary plays. Among other stage actors, Mathias Gnädinger was one of the most prominent Swiss actors of the first Neumarkt ensemble, and from 1968 to 1971 Paul Bühlmann was also a member of the theater's ensemble,

Chor der gläubigen Bürger 

What do people in Zürich believe in? Which prayer rooms, which churches, mosques or temples do they visit? These were the questions at the beginning of a research project in Zürich's religious life. The Neumarkt Theatre developed the play Urban Prayers Zürich from this, which was performed in March 2018 in the midst of the altars and columns of the Glattbrugg Shiva Temple. Five actresses and actors from the Theater am Neumarkt and fifteen members from different religious communities – Muslims, Hindus, Jews, Orthodox, Free Churchers and also atheists – form the Chor der gläubigen Bürger (englisch: Choir of Believing Citizens). But they do not speak with one voice. The ensemble tries, often in vain, to find a voice. But as soon as one of them starts talking, the other one already has his say. They talk to each other with many tongues and then pass each other again.

Facilities 
The theatre on the two floors at Neumarkt has about 220 seats, further 40 seats at a small external stage and the crew provides also a rehearsal stage at the Werdinsel location having additional 100 seats.

The city of Zurich supports the theatre annually with 5.4 million Swiss Francs, i.e. 72% of the total expenses of the theater house are financed for over 40 years by an indefinite subsidy contract. Another 330,000 Swiss Francs are paid by the Canton of Zürich. In the context of a provocative play related to a local politician, the city council points out that the Neumarkt theater, being a theatre classed between the classical-oriented Schauspielhaus stage and the independent theatre scene, explicitly has the order to develop and promote experimental forms of theater.

Directors

Cultural heritage 
The building and the adjacent Bilgeriturm are listed in the Swiss inventory of cultural property of national and regional significance as a Class B object of regional importance.

Literature 
 Tanja Stenzl and Andreas Kotte (publisher): Theater am Neumarkt. In: Theaterlexikon der Schweiz. Volume 3, Chronos, Zürich 2005, .

References

External links

  

Theatres in Zürich
Altstadt (Zürich)
Culture of Zürich
Cultural property of regional significance in the canton of Zürich
Theatres completed in 1742
1742 establishments in Europe
18th-century establishments in the Old Swiss Confederacy
18th-century architecture in Switzerland